Fascellina is a genus of moths in the family Geometridae described by Francis Walker in 1860.

Description
Its eyes are hairy. The palpi are stout and reach the vertex of the head, where the first joint is hairy and the third joint minute. Antennae with cilia and bristles. Abdomen stout. Hind tibia not dilated. Forewings with arched costa towards apex. Vein 3 from close to angle of cell and vein 5 from above middle of discocellulars. Vein 7 to 9 stalked from before upper angle. Veins 10 and 11 stalked and joined by bars to vein 12 and veins 8, 9. Hindwings with vein 3 from close to angle of cell.

Species
 Fascellina albicordis Prout, 1932
 Fascellina altiplagiata Holloway, 1976
 Fascellina aua Prout, 1928
 Fascellina aurifera Warren, 1897
 Fascellina castanea Moore, 1877
 Fascellina cervinaria Snellen, 1881
 Fascellina chromataria Walker, 1860
 Fascellina clausaria Walker, 1866
 Fascellina cydra Prout, 1925
 Fascellina dacoda C. Swinhoe, 1893
 Fascellina glaucifulgurea Prout, 1916
 Fascellina inconspicua Warren, 1894
 Fascellina meligerys Prout, 1925
 Fascellina papuensis Warren, 1898
 Fascellina plagiata (Walker, 1866)
 Fascellina pulchracoda Holloway, 1993
 Fascellina punctata Warren, 1898
 Fascellina quadrata Holloway, 1993
 Fascellina rectimarginata Warren, 1894
 Fascellina subsignata Warren, 1893
 Fascellina viridicosta Holloway, 1993

References

Ennominae